Christina Rose Polkowski is an American actress and producer best known to audiences for her work in Grease on Broadway, the award-winning movie musical How Do You Write a Joe Schermann Song, and as the voice of Celes Chere in World of Final Fantasy.

Early life 
Rose was born in Naples, Italy, the daughter of Mary and Allen Polkowski.  She was raised in Macomb Twp., MI and performed in the family band, The Odyssey Sound System, for many years prior to graduating from Central Michigan University with her BFA in Musical Theatre Performance.

Career 
Rose started performing at a very young age making her professional dance debut as an acrobat in The Nutcracker Ballet at the Fox Theatre in Detroit, Michigan.  Soon to follow were numerous starring roles in various theatre productions.  Once graduating from Central Michigan University she immediately joined the cast of the First National Tour of Oklahoma! in 2004. Rose moved to New York City immediately following her run with the tour.  She signed a contract with Walt Disney World in Orlando, Florida, where she joined the original cast of Finding Nemo – The Musical. Rose left the show to make her Broadway Debut in Grease at the Brooks Atkinson Theatre in New York City. During Rose's run with Grease, she was able to shoot various commercials during the day.

Filmography

Theatre

Discography

References

External links

American film actresses
American musical theatre actresses
American television actresses
American video game actresses
American voice actresses
People from Macomb County, Michigan
Central Michigan University alumni
Living people
21st-century American actresses
Year of birth missing (living people)